Investment Week is an investments magazine that covers news, fund performance and sector analysis for investment professionals. The magazine was started by Incisive Media and the first issue appeared on 30 January 1995.

The physical magazine ceased circulation on 28 March 20229 and has since become a digital-only publication.

References

External links
 Official website

1995 establishments in the United Kingdom
Business magazines published in the United Kingdom
Magazines established in 1995
Magazines published in London
Weekly magazines published in the United Kingdom